Tom Gilmore (born September 25, 1964) is an American college football coach and former player.  He was head coach of the Holy Cross Crusaders from 2004 to 2017 and the Lehigh University Mountain Hawks from 2019 to 2022.

Early life and education
Gilmore was born in Philadelphia to Ireland-born parents Jack Gilmore and Sarah "Sadie" (Boyce) Gilmore. He has four siblings, John, Jim (an Ohio State and NFL player), Mike (a Lycoming College Athletic Hall of Fame member), and Mary Ann.  

Gilmore attended St. Bartholomew Parish grade school and then Northeast Catholic High School for Boys. At Northeast, he was selected to the All-Catholic League teams in football, wrestling, and track and field. He graduated in 1982 from Northeast Catholic with high honors and was awareded the school's  Provincial's Medal of Honor.  

Gilmore played attended the University of Pennsylvania, where he was an Academic All-American for the Penn Quakers football team. He graduated from the University of Pennsylvania in 1986, with a bachelor's degree in computer mathematics.

Penn Quakers football
Gilmore was a defensive lineman for the Penn Quakers. He also played one summer for the British Columbia Lions of the Canadian Football League and one summer for the New York Knights of the Arena Football League. 

As a college football player at the University of Pennsylvania, he was a four-time Ivy League champion and was named team captain in 1985. He was selected three times as an All-Ivy League defensive lineman, a second team All-American in 1984, and a third team All-American in 1985.

He received Penn's top male scholar-athlete at graduation and was selected as one of the 12 members of the National Football Foundation and College Football Hall of Fame Scholar-Athlete Team in December 1985. He was named to the University of Pennsylvania Football All-Time Team in 2020, to its All-Century Team in 2000, and was inducted into the Penn Athletics Hall of Fame in 2017.

College football coaching career
Gilmore served as an assistant coach at the University of Pennsylvania, Columbia University, Dartmouth College, and Lehigh University. His first stint as a college football head coach was with the College of the Holy Cross, where he is second on the program's all-time coaching wins list. At Holy Cross, he won a Patriot League title in 2009. The 2009 team lost to eventual national champion Villanova in the national playoffs and completed the season ranked 14th nationally. 

From 2019 to 2022, Gilmore was the head coach of Lehigh University, where his cumulative four-year record was 9–27.

Head coaching record

* Fired after 7 games

References

External links
 Lehigh profile

1964 births
Living people
BC Lions players
Columbia Lions football coaches
Dartmouth Big Green football coaches
Holy Cross Crusaders football coaches
Lehigh Mountain Hawks football coaches
Penn Quakers football coaches
Penn Quakers football players
Sportspeople from Philadelphia
Players of American football from Philadelphia